Matthias Bruns (born 19 August 1957) is a retired German footballer. He spent eight seasons in the Bundesliga with Eintracht Braunschweig, as well as two seasons in the 2. Bundesliga.

References

External links

1957 births
Living people
German footballers
People from Peine (district)
Footballers from Lower Saxony
Eintracht Braunschweig players
Eintracht Braunschweig II players
Association football defenders
Bundesliga players
2. Bundesliga players